Stephan Julian Baard (born 29 April 1992) is a Namibian cricketer. In November 2016, he won the Player's Player of the Year award at Cricket Namibia's annual awards ceremony. In January 2018, he was named in Namibia's squad for the 2018 ICC World Cricket League Division Two tournament. In August 2018, he was named in Namibia's squad for the 2018 Africa T20 Cup.

In March 2019, he was named in Namibia's squad for the 2019 ICC World Cricket League Division Two tournament. He was named as one of the six players to watch during the tournament. Namibia finished in the top four places in the tournament, therefore gaining One Day International (ODI) status. Baard made his ODI debut for Namibia on 27 April 2019, against Oman, in the tournament's final. He was the leading run-scorer for Namibia in the tournament, with 264 runs in six matches.

In May 2019, he was named in Namibia's squad for the Regional Finals of the 2018–19 ICC T20 World Cup Africa Qualifier tournament in Uganda. He made his Twenty20 International (T20I) debut for Namibia against Ghana on 20 May 2019.

In June 2019, he was one of twenty-five cricketers to be named in Cricket Namibia's Elite Men's Squad ahead of the 2019–20 international season. In September 2019, he was named in Namibia's squad for the 2019 ICC T20 World Cup Qualifier tournament in the United Arab Emirates. In September 2021, Baard was named in Namibia's squad for the 2021 ICC Men's T20 World Cup.

References

External links
 

1992 births
Living people
Namibian cricketers
Namibia One Day International cricketers
Namibia Twenty20 International cricketers
Namibian cricket captains
Place of birth missing (living people)